Soraya Phomla Her nickname is So She is a Thai indoor volleyball player. She plays as a setter.

She is a member of the Thailand women's national volleyball team in 2014 and 2016. Her current club is Supreme VC.

Early life 
Soraya Phomla, She was born August 6, 1992. Her nickname is So. Her hometown is Chaing Rai, Thailand.

graduation 

 WatYaiChaiMongKol School 
 Ayutthaya Technological Commercial College.
 Bachelor's degree from Sripatum University 
 Current Studying for Master's degree from Sripatum University

Clubs 
  Ayutthaya ATCC (2010–2015)
  Cagayan Valley (2012–2013)
  Idea Khonkaen (2015–2016)
  Supreme Chonburi (2016–present)

Awards

Individuals
 2011–12 Thailand League "Best Server"
 2012–13 Thailand League "Best Setter"
 2013–14 Thailand League "Best Setter"
 2013 Shakey's V-league "Most Valuable Player"
 2013 Shakey's V-league "Best Setter"
 2014 Thai-Denmark Super League "Most Valuable Player"
 2015–16 Thailand League "Best Setter"
 2016 VTV Cup Championship "Best Setter"
 2016–17 Thailand League "Best Setter"
 2017–18 Thailand League "Best Setter"

Clubs
 2010–11 Thailand League -  Champion, with Krungkao Mektec
 2013 Shakey's V-league -  Champion, with Cagayan Valley
 2014 Thai–Denmark Super League -  Champion, with Ayutthaya A.T.C.C
 2014–15 Thailand League -  Runner-Up, with Ayutthaya A.T.C.C
 2016–17 Thailand League -  Champion, with Supreme Chonburi
 2017 Thai–Denmark Super League -  Champion, with Supreme Chonburi
 2017 Asian Club Championship -  Champion, with Supreme Chonburi
 2017–18 Thailand League -  Champion, with Supreme Chonburi
 2018 Thai–Denmark Super League -  Champion, with Supreme Chonburi
 2018–19 Thailand League -  Runner-Up, with Supreme Chonburi
 2019 Thai–Denmark Super League -  Champion, with Supreme Chonburi
 2019 Asian Club Championship -  Runner-Up, with Supreme Chonburi
2021 Asian Club Championship -  Bronze medal, with Supreme Chonburi
2021 SAT Volleyball Invitation in Sisaket -  Champion, with Supreme Chonburi

University Team (SPU) 

 2015 CH7 Championship 2015 -  Runner-Up, with SPU Volleyball Club
 2016 CH7 Championship 2016 -  Champion, with SPU Volleyball Club
 2017 CH7 Championship 2017 -  Runner-Up, with SPU Volleyball Club
 2018 CH7 Championship 2018 -  Champion, with SPU Volleyball Club

National team

Senior team 
 2016 Asian Cup -  Bronze medal

U-20 

 2008 Asian Cup -  Bronze medal

References

External links
 FIVB Biography

1992 births
Living people
Soraya Phomla
Soraya Phomla
Soraya Phomla
Soraya Phomla